Iodine monobromide is an interhalogen compound with the formul IBr. It is a dark red solid that melts near room temperature. Like iodine monochloride, IBr is used in some types of iodometry.  It serves as a source of I+. Its Lewis acid properties are compared with those of ICl and I2 in the ECW model. It can form CT adducts with Lewis donors.

Iodine monobromide is formed when iodine and bromine are combined in a chemical reaction:.
I2 + Br2 → 2 IBr

References

Iodine compounds
Interhalogen compounds
Diatomic molecules
Bromides